The Philippines men's national lacrosse team is the national team which represents the Philippines in international lacrosse competitions. It is organized by the Philippines Lacrosse Association, which is a full member of World Lacrosse and an associate member of the Asia Pacific Lacrosse Union.

History

The Philippine national team played their first ever lacrosse game against Costa Rica at the Estadio Municipal El Labrador in Vázquez de Coronado in December 2012. The Philippines won that game with Ron Garcia being the first to score an international goal for the Philippines

Lacrosse was officially introduced in the Philippines in September 2013, when the Philippines Lacrosse Association (PLA) outreach director Justin Manjares and President Ron Garcia met with Philippine Olympic Committee (POC) and the Philippine Sports Commission (PSA) regarding the lacrosse body's agenda and talked about promoting the sport with the guidance of the POC and PSC.

The PLA became the 50th member of World Lacrosse (then known as Federation of International Lacrosse; FIL) as voted on February 17, 2014.

The Philippines made their debut at the World Lacrosse Championship in the 2014 edition, though they only participated as a festival squad and did not feature in the main competition. In the World Lacrosse Festivals, the national team played in the Elite Division against teams from Ireland, Japan, Thailand, and the United States. They finished seventh out of 16 teams with two wins and two losses. The Philippines participated in other international invitational tournaments such as the 2014 International Lacrosse Festival of the Israel Lacrosse Association, the 2016 Philadelphia International Showdown, and the 2017 Memorial Day Weekend International Lacrosse Festival.

The Philippines has yet to admitted as a member of the Asia-Pacific Lacrosse Union as of 2018, meaning they were unable to participate in the 2015 and 2017 ASPAC games. In mid-July 2017, The Philippine national team appointed Carthage Senior High School coach Kirk Ventiquattro as their head coach for the 2018 World Lacrosse Championship. The American coach accepted the post agreeing with the national team management that the position would not affect his other duty as Carthage's varsity lacrosse coach. They made their official debut in the 2018 edition of the World Lacrosse Championship and played in the main tournament. They were made part of the Grey Division along with the Czech Republic and Belgium.They finished the top of their division. Overall they finished 10th losing only to host Israel and Germany in the later stages.

The Philippines qualified for the 2023 World Lacrosse Championship.

Competitive record

World Lacrosse Championship

Fixtures and results

2018
World Lacrosse Championship

2022
World Lacrosse Championship – Asia Pacific Qualifiers

Current roster

Source:

Head coaches
 Kirk Ventiquattro (2017−2018)
 Justin Manjares (2022−)

Notes

References

National lacrosse teams
Lacrosse
men's national team